The Levante ("Levant, East") is a name used to refer to the eastern region of the Iberian Peninsula, on the Spanish Mediterranean coast. It roughly corresponds to the former Xarq Al-Andalus, but has no modern geopolitical definition. Rather, it broadly includes the autonomous communities of Valencia (provinces of Alicante, Castellón and Valencia), Murcia, Catalonia (Barcelona, Girona and Tarragona), the eastern part of Castile-La Mancha (Albacete and Cuenca), eastern Andalusia (Almería, Granada and Jaén), southern Aragon (Teruel) and the Balearic Islands.

However, in its normal usage, the Levante specifically refers to the Valencian Community, Murcia, Almería, the Balearics and the coast of Catalonia.

Among inhabitants of the Levante, the term is rarely used.  Its literal meaning is "the east", and thus makes sense only from the perspective of those who live to the west of Valencia, Catalonia, or the Balearics.  However, the Levante does lend its name to a popular regional beer, Estrella Levante, owned by S.A. Damm and produced in Murcia as well as Levante UD, a Spanish football club team in Valencia.

See also
 Levante Offensive
 Levante UD
 Levant (wind), called Levante in Spanish
 Llevant
 Levant

Bibliography
Academic source for Levante: "Levante, the collective name for four Mediterranean provinces of Spain forming two autonomous regions officially known as Comunitat Valenciana and Región de Murcia." P. 400.  Robinson, Jancis (ed.) 2006. The Oxford Companion to Wine, 3. edition. Oxford, Oxford University Press.

Coasts of Spain